The Supreme Court of Justice of Paraguay is the highest court of Paraguay. The Senate and the President of Paraguay select its nine ministers (judges) on the basis of recommendations from a constitutionally created Consejo de la Magistratura (Council of Magistrates). The court meets at the Palace of Justice in Asuncion. The court consists of three chambers: Constitutional, Civil and Commercial and Criminal and each chamber has three ministers. The present President (Chief Justice) of the Supreme Court is Alberto Joaquín Martínez Simón.

Notes

External links
 

Paraguay
Politics of Paraguay
Political organisations based in Paraguay
Law of Paraguay